The Illawarra Junction is a major railway junction located near the Eveleigh Railway Workshops, in the inner western suburbs of Sydney, New South Wales, Australia. This complex junction joins a number of different lines and yards. There are two pairs of tracks (named Illawarra Main and Illawarra Local) from the Illawarra railway line from the south and three pairs of tracks (named Local, Suburban and Main) from the Main Suburban railway line from the west.

Arrangement

Illawarra Line 
The first set of junctions is in the south-west corner, just north of Erskineville station, where trains coming from the Illawarra line can dive into the Eastern Suburbs line. Further north is the Illawara Dive, where trains from the Illawarra Main can crossover to the Main without obstructing any of the other tracks. This dive is mostly used by weekday off-peak South Coast Line trains terminating at Sydney Terminal (Central platforms 1–12), services on the Southern Highlands Line or NSW TrainLink Southern regional services. East of Redfern station there are no further crossovers with the lines continuing toward the flying junctions at Central. On either side of the Illawarra Main, there are connections (with no track) to the disused platforms 13–14 at Redfern.

Main Suburban Line 
In the north-west corner, just north of Macdonaldtown station, there are a number of crossovers allowing trains to switch between the Local, Suburban and Main lines. These crossovers are seldom used. Just past the end of the entry/exit track for Macdonaldtown Yard are two crossovers between the Local and Illawarra Local tracks, allowing trains from the Illawarra Local to access Sydney Terminal. There is also a tunnel from the Eveleigh Railway Workshops connecting to the Up Main just beyond Redfern station. East of Redfern station is where the Main Suburban line ends. There are a complex set of flat junctions allowing trains on all three pairs of tracks to enter Sydney Terminal. The local and suburban tracks also continue on the City Circle and North Shore line respectively.

Eveleigh Maintenance Centre 
Eveleigh Maintenance Centre lies to the south of all the surface tracks and on top of the Eastern Suburbs line tunnels. There are several crossovers providing access to the yard. There is a crossover in the south-west corner, allowing trains from the Up & Down Illawarra Main to access the yard. Another crossover allows trains to access the Down Illawarra Dive, which is actually bi-directional, due to the crossover at the other end onto the Up Illawarra Dive. Trains from Sydney Yard can enter/exit through the Engine Dive, which passes from the Down Main, under Redfern station, to the yard. Trains to/from the City Circle can enter through the Arrival/Departure Road, which joins the Up/Down Illawarra Main.

Macdonaldtown Yard (not shown on map) 
Macdonaldtown Yard lies between the Main Suburban and Illawarra lines. It has a single entry/exit road. Crossovers allow trains to enter the yard from the Up/Down Local lines and allow trains to exit the yard onto the Up Local or Up Illawarra Local lines.

Signalling 

See also

Railways in Sydney

References

External links
 

Rail transport in Sydney
Main Suburban railway line
Illawarra railway line
Rail infrastructure in New South Wales